The 25th and final season of Arthur aired on PBS Kids in the United States on February 21, 2022. On July 27, 2021, executive producer Carol Greenwald announced that this would be the final season of Arthur for undisclosed reasons.

Episodes

Production 
Oasis Animation produced the 25th season of Arthur.

All production of the season was completed by the end of 2019.

References

External links

Arthur (TV series) seasons
2022 American television seasons 
2022 Canadian television seasons